Sphaerodactylus guanajae is a species of lizard in the family Sphaerodactylidae. It is endemic to Islas de la Bahía and Islas de la Bahía in Honduras.

References

Sphaerodactylus
Reptiles of Honduras
Endemic fauna of Honduras
Reptiles described in 2012
Taxa named by Stephen Blair Hedges